Robiskie is a surname. Notable people with the surname include:

 Andrew Robiskie (born 1989), American football player
 Brian Robiskie (born 1987), American football player
 Terry Robiskie (born 1954), American football player and coach